Subotiv is a village (selo) in central Ukraine. It is located in Cherkasy Raion (district) of Cherkasy Oblast (province), near the town of Chyhyryn. It belongs to Chyhyryn urban hromada, of which the administration is located in Chyhyryn.

Until 18 July 2020, Subotiv belonged to Chyhyryn Raion. The raion was abolished in July 2020 as part of the administrative reform of Ukraine, and its area was merged into Cherkasy Raion.

The village is located on the right bank of the Tiasmyn River, a tributary of the Dnieper, 7 km from Chyhyryn, 21 km from Adamivka river port, and 38 km from Fundukliivka railway station. A local auto road 2414 runs through the village.

The village name, Subotiv, according to one legend, took its roots from a live fire from oak firewood (known as "subotka") that was in front of Perun. According to another legend, it came from the name of the place where water from two tributaries combines (known as "subod'").

History
Based on archeological studies, the place was settled as early as Bronze Age. At the place there are also traces of Early Slavic, and Kiev Rus settlements. In the documents the first known reference to the village is dated back to early 17th century.

Famous places
Illinska Church, a church built by the order of Bohdan Khmelnytsky in 1653. It is also the place where Khmelnytsky is buried. The church is pictured on one of the paintings by Taras Shevchenko in 1845. The church is also pictured on ₴5 banknote, which is currently in circulation in Ukraine.

Notable people 
 Bohdan Khmelnytsky (ca.1595–1657), a Ukrainian military commander and Hetman of Zaporizhian Host.

References

Villages in Cherkasy Raion